Delmont may refer to:

Places

United States
 Delmont, New Jersey
 Delmont, Ohio
 Delmont, Pennsylvania
 Delmont, South Dakota
 Camp Delmont, one of three camps that make up the Boy Scout Musser Scout Reservation, Pennsylvania

Other
 Delmont (surname)

See also
 Del Monte (disambiguation)